General elections were held in Lebanon between 24 March and 7 April 1968. Independent candidates won the majority of seats, although many of them were considered to be members of various blocs. Voter turnout was 49.6%. Politically the election was a confrontation between the mainly christian Tripartite Alliance and Chehabists candidates.

Background
According to the 1960 constitution, the 99 seats were divided amongst ethnic and religious groups:

Results

Electoral districts

Marjeyoun-Hasbaya 
The district has 4 seats allocated to 2 Shiites, 1 Sunni and 1 Greek Orthodox Christian. There were eleven candidates in the fray, with ten candidates contesting on three different tickets. The eleventh candidate contested on his own. The fight stood primarily between two tickets, each headed by a candidate from the al-As'ad family (a powerful Shiite family in the area).

References

 
Lebanon
1968 in Lebanon
Elections in Lebanon
Election and referendum articles with incomplete results